Eagle River is an unincorporated community and census-designated place (CDP) in the U.S. state of Michigan.  It is the county seat of Keweenaw County. Its population was 65 at the 2020 census, which makes it by far the least-populated county seat in the state of Michigan.  As an unincorporated community, Eagle River has no legal autonomy and is part of Allouez Township and Houghton Township.

History

Eagle River was a boom town of the copper mining era in the Keweenaw. Copper was discovered in 1845 at the Cliff Range nearby, the so-called "Cliff Lode". The land of the Eagle River community had been leased by the Keweenaw Copper Company in 1843. It was later platted by the Phoenix Company and sold as individual lots. The first postmaster was named on October 24, 1845. It was part of Houghton County until Keweenaw County was organized in 1861. The profitability of the area's copper mines had begun to decline sharply by around 1870.

The Eagle River Timber Bridge is a wooden arch bridge that carries highway M-26 over the Eagle River. It opened in 1990 as a replacement for the historic Lake Shore Drive Bridge that runs parallel to it.

Eagle River is home to the Holy Transfiguration Skete, a Byzantine Catholic monastery and community, which is known for producing jams and other foodstuffs from berries collected in the nearby forests. Holy Transfiguration is one of only a few Byzantine Catholic monasteries in the United States.

The community of Eagle River was listed as a newly-organized census-designated place for the 2010 census, meaning it now has officially defined boundaries and population statistics for the first time.

Geography

Eagle River is listed as being part of both Allouez Township and Houghton Township.

The community is on M-26 on the north side of the Keweenaw Peninsula on the shores of Lake Superior. The Mohawk 49950 ZIP Code serves the community.

The decommissioned Eagle River Light is on the west bank of the river on a sand bluff overlooking Lake Superior, although the view is partially obscured by condominiums.

Demographics

Transportation

References

Unincorporated communities in Keweenaw County, Michigan
County seats in Michigan
Houghton micropolitan area, Michigan
Populated places established in 1843
Unincorporated communities in Michigan
Census-designated places in Michigan
Census-designated places in Keweenaw County, Michigan
1843 establishments in Michigan
Michigan populated places on Lake Superior